Fudbalski klub Kozara Gradiška (Serbian Cyrillic: Фудбалски клуб Koзapa Градишка) is a professional football club from the town of Gradiška, in northern Bosnia and Herzegovina. The club played in the Premier League of Bosnia and Herzegovina in the 2002–03 season. However, they ended up being relegated to the First League of the Republika Srpska after their first season in the country's top league. The club played from 2003 to 2011 in the second level of Bosnia and Herzegovina. After the season 2010–11, the team's promoted again to the Premier League. At the end of the 2011–12 season, they finished on 16th position and were relegated again to the lower tier.

Honours

Domestic

League
First League of the Republika Srpska:
 Winners (1): 2010–11
Yugoslav Second League:
Third place (1): 1973–74
Bosnia and Herzegovina Republic League:
 Winners (1): 1980–81

Cups
Republika Srpska Cup:
 Winners (3): 1993–94, 1999–00, 2000–01

Club seasons
Sources:

Players

Current squad

Players with multiple nationalities
  Alen Čamdžić
  Salvador Pliego

Former players
For a list of players with Wikipedia article, please see :Category:FK Kozara Gradiška players.

Kozara technical staff

Historical list of managers

   Velimir Sombolac
  Ilija Miljuš
  Dragan Vukša
  Cvijetin Blagojević
  Borče Sredojević (2003–04)
  Miloš Pojić (2004 – June 2009)
  Ile Perišić (July 2009 – June 2010)
  Vinko Marinović (July 2010 – Sept 2011)
  Vlado Jagodić (Sept 2011 – April 2012)
  Siniša Đurić (caretaker) (May 2012)
  Miloš Pojić (May 2012 – April 2013)
  Igor Janković (April 2013 – March 2015)
  Saša Krupljanin (March 2015 – Oct 2015)
  Stojan Timarac (caretaker) (Oct 2015)
  Velimir Stojnić (Oct 2015 – June 2017)
  Borče Sredojević (June 2017 – Sept 2017)
  Predrag Tomaš (caretaker) (Sept 2017)
  Siniša Đurić (Oct 2017 – Dec 2017)
  Vule Trivunović (Dec 2017 – Dec 2018)
  Igor Janković (Dec 2018 – June 2019)
  Nedžad Žerić (July 2019 – June 2022)
  Saša Krupljanin (June 2022 – January 2023)
  Alen Medović (January 2023 – present)

Club management

References

External links
 Official website 
 FK Kozara at FSRS

 
Association football clubs established in 1945
Football clubs in Republika Srpska
Football clubs in Bosnia and Herzegovina
Football clubs in Yugoslavia
Gradiška, Bosnia and Herzegovina
1945 establishments in Bosnia and Herzegovina